DierAnimal (from the Flemish and French words for "animal") is an animal welfare political party in Belgium. The party seeks to create a society where all living things are respected equally regardless of skin color, gender, age or species. It supports "animal liberation" and opposes the meat industry. In the 2019 regional elections, with Victoria Austraet the party won a single seat in the Brussels Parliament.

Austraet was evicted from the party in May 2020 due to disagreements. The party thus lost its only parliamentary representative.

References 

Political parties in Belgium
Animal welfare organisations based in Belgium
Animal advocacy parties